The spotfin flyingfish, Cheilopogon furcatus, is a fish in the flying fish family, Exocoetidae.

References

Exocoetidae
Fish described in 1815